Sceloporus binocularis, the Nuevo León crevice swift, is a species of lizard in the family Phrynosomatidae. It is endemic to Mexico.

References

Sceloporus
Endemic reptiles of Mexico
Reptiles described in 1936
Taxa named by Emmett Reid Dunn